The 2010–11 CERS Cup was the 31st season of the CERS Cup, Europe's second club roller hockey competition organized by CERH. 28 teams from nine national associations qualified for the competition as a result of their respective national league placing in the previous season. Following a preliminary phase and two knockout rounds, Benfica won the tournament at its final four, in Vilanova i la Geltrú, Spain, on 7 and 8 May 2011.

Preliminary phase 

|}

Knockout stage

The knockout stage consisted in double-legged series for the round of 16 and the quarterfinals, where the four winners would join the Final Four.

See also
2011–12 CERH European League
2011–12 CERH Women's European League

Notes

References
 2012 CERS Cup Final Four at cerh.eu
 Bassano 54 website
  Roller Hockey links worldwide
  Mundook-World Roller Hockey
 Hoqueipatins.com - Results from Roller Hockey
 CERH website
  Roller Hockey links worldwide
  Mundook-World Roller Hockey

World Skate Europe Cup
CERS Cup
CERS Cup